António Teixeira (1707–after 1769) was a Portuguese composer.

António Teixeira may also refer to:

 António Teixeira (Portuguese footballer), Portuguese footballer
 António Teixeira Lopes (1866–1942), Portuguese sculptor
 António Teixeira de Sousa (1857–1917), Portuguese medical doctor and politician
 António Teixeira (footballer, born 1930), former Portuguese footballer
 António Teixeira (futsal player) (born 1975), Portuguese futsal player